Porsche-Diesel Super is a tractor that was manufactured by Porsche between 1956 and 1963. 

It is powered by an air-cooled, four-stroke, 2466 cc, three-cylinder diesel.

External links 

 http://www.porsche-diesel-club.de/
 http://www.brunnegard.se/
 http://www.porsche-diesel.com/
 http://www.porsche-diesel-club.nl/
Images of Porsche Tractor

Super